Acrostictella is a genus of picture-winged flies in the family Ulidiidae, containing a single species, Acrostictella parallela.

Distribution
Brazil, Paraguay, Argentina.

References

Ulidiidae
Diptera of South America
Taxa named by Friedrich Georg Hendel
Monotypic Brachycera genera